Sanica is a minor river in the north-west part of Bosnia and Herzegovina. It flows into the Sana near Vrhpolje. The village Sanica got its name from the river.

Rivers of Bosnia and Herzegovina
Tributaries of the Sana (river)